Fighter Pilot is a BBC television documentary series that was broadcast in the UK on BBC One, from 9 September to 28 October 1981. It was about the training of fast jet pilots in the Royal Air Force and followed the progress of six candidates as they went through the three-year programme. The BBC and the RAF first agreed to work together on a documentary in 1978, when there was a poor level of recruitment and a shortage of pilots in the service. At the time it cost £1 million to train a pilot (£4 million in 2011). The training process, from selection to operational service has a high drop-out rate and only one of the six original candidates went on to fly fast jets.

Three of the candidates were airmen who already served in the RAF, while the others were from civilian backgrounds (qualified nurse, zoologist and milkman/farm worker). The series was produced by Colin Strong, who closely followed the candidates for three-and-a-half years. To gain a detailed insight in to the process, he undertook the RAF basic flying training course himself and flew solo in a Jet Provost.

Candidates

Episodes

Book
A book of the television series was produced by Colin Strong and co-written with the author, Duff Hart-Davis.

References

1981 British television series debuts
1981 British television series endings
1980s British documentary television series
BBC television documentaries
British military aviation
1980s British television miniseries
Documentary television series about aviation
English-language television shows
Royal Air Force mass media